Johnny Ray Lovick (born May 9, 1951) is an American politician and law enforcement officer serving as a member of the Washington State Senate, representing the 44th district since 2021. A member of the Democratic Party, he was appointed in December 2021 to fill a vacancy created by the resignation of Steve Hobbs to become Washington secretary of state.

Career 
Lovick previously served in the House from 1999 until 2007 and 2016 until 2021, as Snohomish County sheriff, and on the Mill Creek city council. From 2013 to 2016, Lovick was the Snohomish County Executive, appointed after the resignation of Aaron Reardon; Lovick lost to Dave Somers in the 2015 election.

Lovick has served as a sergeant of the Washington State Patrol since 1997.

During the 2021 legislative session, Lovick's first proposed bill to make Pickleball the official sport of Washington passed and became official in March 2022. In the 2022 general election, Lovesick won a full term for the state Senate with over 58% of the votes cast.

Awards 
 2020 Legislator of the Year. Presented by The Washington State Fraternal Order of Police.

Personal life
Lovick and his wife, Karen, have 5 children.

References

External links
 Legislative/Caucus Page
 Campaign website

|-

1951 births
21st-century African-American politicians
20th-century African-American people
21st-century American politicians
African-American state legislators in Washington (state)
Living people
People from Mill Creek, Washington
Politicians from Shreveport, Louisiana
Speakers of the Washington House of Representatives
Democratic Party members of the Washington House of Representatives
Washington (state) city council members
Washington (state) sheriffs